"Chime" is the first single from the British electronic group Orbital. It was originally recorded on cassette tape and allegedly cost less than £1 to produce. The track was originally released in December 1989 and was a big underground success. In 1990, it had a wider release on FFRR Records, and reached number 17 on the UK Singles Chart.

The track has been referred to as the British equivalent to Derrick May's seminal classic "Strings of Life" and was included at number 11 on Mixmag magazine's 100 Greatest Dance Singles of All Time. Mixmag also included it on two "best ever dance" compilations, B!g Tunes: The Greatest Dance Singles of All Time (2001) and The Greatest Dance Tracks of All Time (2013).

Creation

According to Paul Hartnoll, the track was recorded in Orbital's "under the stairs" home studio – "a knocked-through stair cupboard that my dad set up as a home office" in Sevenoaks, Kent. Key amongst the band's equipment at this time was their Roland TB-303 synthesiser which had been acquired for £100 from a northern working men's club keyboard player who was living in London.

Paul stated that he recorded "Chime" in the home studio before he went down to the pub. He played the cassette to pirate DJ Jazzy M at his record store in London. The DJ loved the track but insisted that it be extended for another couple of minutes. The tape recorder they recorded the track onto ran too fast, resulting in it being slightly slower than intended when played back on other decks. The track ended being 12 mins 40 after largely reprising the first half and improvising with the drum machine and TB-303 synth. The B-side of the record was the track "Deeper", featuring samples from a spoken-word relaxation record.

The original pressing (the first on Jazzy M's Oh'Zone records) of 1,000 records sold out quickly. Record labels clamoured to give "Chime" a full release and in the end they went with Pete Tong's FFRR record label. An edited version was produced and created in a more professional studio. It was downsized using fewer elements from the original 12-inch version, shortening it to 3 minutes and 14 seconds.

Top of the Pops

The track made the Top 40 of the British charts and Orbital made their first TV appearance performing live on BBC TV's Top of the Pops show in March 1990. They appeared wearing Anti-Poll Tax T-shirts. The brothers wanted to play live but the show's producers stated that they had to mime. The band were embarrassed about having to do so and thought that the dancer they were provided with was also bored. They stood around on stage and did not even pretend to mime. The show's production staff did not invite Orbital back on for another six years. After the appearance the tune went six places up the chart to number 17.

Although not their highest-charting song; four other Orbital songs have reached higher positions, it was the song that brought them to a mainstream audience.

Live airplay

"Chime" is still regularly played live by the band, usually as a medley of the original version and the "Chime Crime" mix from the Mutations EP. The band often use it to end the set.

Versions of "Chime"

There are numerous versions and remixes of "Chime". Orbital themselves have done several. Below is a list of them:

 Orbital
 Original version – 1989
 "Helium Mix" – 1990
 "Chime Crime" – 1992
 "Live Style Mix" – 2002
 "Christmas Chime" – 2013
 "30 Something Years Later Mix" - 2022
 JZJ – 1990
 "Bacardi Mix"
 "Oh Yah Mix"
 "Friends of Matthew Mix" – 1991
 Ray Keith Mutation Mix – 1992
 Joey Beltram & Program 2 – 1992
 Mike Flowers – 1997
 "Krisp DoubleU Mix"
 "Hairy Butter Mix"
 Knuckleheadz – 2006
 The Shapeshifters – 2008, and remixes of that version by:
 Martijn Ten Velden – 2008
 Henrik B – 2008
 Moudaber Bombarge – 2008
 Special Request - 2021
 Eli Brown - 2022
 Octave One - 2022

Track listing

Oh'Zone Records – December 1989

12" vinyl record
"Chime" (12:42)
"Deeper" (15:33)

FFRR – March 1990

12" vinyl record
"Chime" (12:38)
"Deeper" (Edit) (6:55)

12" vinyl record (The Remixes)
"Chime" (JZJ Bacardi Remix) (6:23)
"Chime" (JZJ Oh Ya Mix) (6:28)

7" vinyl record
A. "Chime" (Edit) (3:15)
B. "Deeper" (Edit) (4:05)

CD single
"Chime" (Edit) (3:15)
"Chime" (12-inch version) (12:40)
"Deeper" (Edit) (4:06)

Cassette single
"Chime" (Edit) (3:15)
"Deeper" (Edit) (4:05)

Charts

References

Further reading

External links
  with Orbital by DJ Magazine about the making of "Chime" and their early days of producing dance music
 Orbital – Chime, Top of the Pops 1990 – YouTube
 Analytical précis of Chime by Orbital: towards an analysis of electronic dance music – Robert Ratcliffe – Orema
 Orbital – Chime at Discogs.com

1990 debut singles
1989 songs
Acid house songs
FFRR Records singles
Orbital (band) songs
Songs written by Paul Hartnoll